"Spaceman" is a song written and recorded by the American singer-songwriter Harry Nilsson, released on his 1972 album Son of Schmilsson.

One of the highlights on Son of Schmilsson, with its dramatic opening fanfare and a cross between folk with a heavy R&B rhythm, the song explains the desire and downfall of the narrator, who wished to be a spaceman and now wants to go back to Earth but is stuck in space.

The song was one of the three Nilsson's songs that became a hit of the year, the other two being "Remember (Christmas)" and "You're Breaking My Heart". 

Arranger Paul Buckmaster said that he asked Nilsson if he could put a string section on the song, and Nilsson agreed. Buckmaster brought more than strings: He included the medieval instruments shawm and sackbut. He said that someone named Moxie, "the genius of the harmonica in London at the time," played bass harmonica in a "chugging" rhythm style, part of the rhythm section.

"Spaceman" featured prominently in a trailer for the HBO comedy series Avenue 5 (2020), and in the first and final episodes of first season for the 2020 Netflix comedy series Space Force.

The song was covered by the American band the Roches on the 1995 tribute album For the Love of Harry: Everybody Sings Nilsson.

Personnel
 Harry Nilsson – vocals, electric piano
 Nicky Hopkins – piano 
 Peter Frampton – acoustic guitar
 Chris Spedding – acoustic guitar
 John Uribe – acoustic guitar
 Klaus Voormann – bass
 Ringo Starr (credited as Richie Snare) – drums
 Richard Perry – percussion
 "Moxie" – bass harmonica
 Paul Buckmaster – orchestral arrangement

Chart performance

References

External links 
http://www.allmusic.com/song/spaceman-mt0034225631
http://www.discogs.com/Nilsson-Son-Of-Schmilsson/release/682504

1972 songs
Harry Nilsson songs
RCA Victor singles
Song recordings produced by Richard Perry
Songs about spaceflight
Songs written by Harry Nilsson